The 2016 Asian Junior and Cadet Table Tennis Championships were held in Bangkok, Thailand, from  16 to 21 September 2016. It was organised by the  Table Tennis Association of Thailand under the authority of the Asian Table Tennis Union (ATTU).

Medal summary

Events

Medal table

See also

2016 World Junior Table Tennis Championships
Asian Table Tennis Championships
Asian Table Tennis Union

References

Asian Junior and Cadet Table Tennis Championships
Asian Junior and Cadet Table Tennis Championships
Asian Junior and Cadet Table Tennis Championships
Asian Junior and Cadet Table Tennis Championships
Table tennis competitions in Thailand
International sports competitions hosted by Thailand
Asian Junior and Cadet Table Tennis Championships